Preston is a city in Lancashire, England, that contains about 340 listed buildings. Its recorded history goes back to the Roman era, and in the medieval period it was a market town and a port, its first charter being granted in 1179. The city stands at the lowest crossing point of the River Ribble, which has given it great strategic importance. From the 16th century it was a centre for the spinning and weaving industries, and its greatest growth came from the 1770s with the development of steam power. By 1835 (when it was still a town) it contained 40 factories, and this had grown to 77 factories in 1869. Its population rose from about 12,000 in 1801 to about 69,000 in 1851, and one reflection of this was and this resulted in poor housing and social conditions. As a consequence of this there was fear of riots and other disturbances from the Chartists, the response to this being the building of Fulwood Barracks in the 1840s. There was much church building in the 19th century, including a number of notable Roman Catholic churches, reflecting the importance of Catholicism in the town and area. Later in the century and in the early 20th century the rise of civic pride and prosperity resulted in a number of notable civic buildings, particularly Fulwood Barracks. During the 20th century there was much clearing of slum properties, and of many other older buildings. The Preston Dock closed in the 1980s. Few of the 20th-century buildings have been listed, with the exception of the Central bus station and car park, which was opened in 1969 and had been threatened with demolition.

In the unparished area of Preston, there are about 340 buildings that are recorded in the National Heritage List for England as designated listed buildings. Of these, three are listed at Grade I, eleven at Grade II*, and the rest at Grade II (for the criteria of these grades see the Key below). Despite the long history of the town, only three of the listed buildings have their origins before the 17th century, and only about 25 date from the 18th century. The great majority date from the 19th century, reflecting the growth of the cotton industry in the town at that time, with cotton mills, housing for their workers, and churches for their worship. Many of the houses from the earlier part of the century are Georgian in style, and most of these are located to the south of the main streets of the town, Church Street and Fishergate. Later in the century public parks were created, and a number of listed buildings are associated with them. Later still, the great civic buildings were built, mainly in the centre of the town around Market Place.

Key

Buildings

References

Citations

Sources

 

 
 
 

Preston
Buildings and structures in Preston